Jeremy Baker (born 1958) is a British judge.

Jeremy Baker may also refer to:

Jeremy Baker, High Sheriff of Bristol, 1771
Jeremy Baker, character in Revolution (TV series)
Jeremy Baker, Lambeth Council election, 2006

See also
Jerry Baker (disambiguation)
Gerry Baker (disambiguation)